Gura Vitioarei is a commune in Prahova County, Muntenia, Romania. It is composed of five villages: Bughea de Jos, Făgetu, Fundeni, Gura Vitioarei, and Poiana Copăceni.

The commune is located in the north-central part of the county, in the sub-Carpathian area of the Teleajen River valley. The Ploiești Sud–Măneciu railway also passes through the commune, which is served by the Făget Teleajen stop.

Natives
 Irina Loghin

References

Communes in Prahova County
Localities in Muntenia